Yena may refer to:
 Choi Ye-na, or Yena, South Korean singer and actress
 Yena, member of the South Korean girl group April
 Chang Ye-na, South Korean badminton player
 Khaka Yena, South African music producer and DJ

See also 
 Iena (disambiguation)
 Jena (disambiguation)
 Yeina Island